The Fresno State Bulldogs football statistical leaders are individual statistical leaders of the Fresno State Bulldogs football program in various categories, including passing, rushing, receiving, total offense, defensive stats, and kicking. Within those areas, the lists identify single-game, single-season, and career leaders. The Bulldogs represent California State University, Fresno in the NCAA's Mountain West Conference (MW).

Fresno State began competing in intercollegiate football in 1921, but these lists are dominated by more recent players for several reasons:
 Since 1979, seasons have increased from 10 games to 11 and then 12 games in length.
 The NCAA didn't allow freshmen to play varsity football until 1972 (with the exception of the World War II years), allowing players to have four-year careers.
 Bowl games only began counting toward single-season and career statistics in 2002. The Bulldogs have played in 11 bowl games since this decision, giving many recent players an extra game to accumulate statistics.
 Similarly, the Bulldogs have appeared in the Mountain West Conference Football Championship Game twice since it began in 2013.
 Additionally, Fresno State has been grouped in the same MW football division as Hawaii since divisional play began in 2013, meaning that it plays at Hawaii every other year (currently in even-numbered years). This is relevant because the NCAA allows teams that play at Hawaii in a given season to schedule 13 regular-season games instead of the normal 12. The Bulldogs have played a 13-game regular season once since divisional play began, in 2014.

These lists are updated through the end of the 2020 season.

Passing

Passing yards

Passing touchdowns

Rushing

Rushing yards

Rushing touchdowns

Receiving

Receptions

Receiving yards

Receiving touchdowns

Total offense
Total offense is the sum of passing and rushing statistics. It does not include receiving or returns.

Total offense yards

Touchdowns responsible for
"Touchdowns responsible for" is the official NCAA term for combined passing and rushing touchdowns.

Defense

Interceptions

Tackles

Sacks

Kicking

Field goals made

Field goal percentage

References

Fresno State

Lists of California State University people